Chas. Pidsumky Dnya is a cultural-political talk show on 5 Kanal. Roman Chajka, Svjatoslav Tsegolko and Sergiy Dorofejev present debate on actual events of day from world of art, culture, politics and social life.

External links
 Official page of program "Chas Pidsumky Dnya" on Facebook
 Page of program "Chas Pidsumky Dnya" on site of 5 kanal (Ukraine)

Ukrainian television talk shows